Holozoster ovalis is a species of harvestmen endemic to Mahe Island of Seychelles.

References

Harvestmen
Animals described in 1902
Endemic fauna of Seychelles